The Grand Canyon of the Yellowstone is an oil on canvas painting created by English-American artist Thomas Moran in 1872. It is credited with increasing the American public's interest in conservation efforts. The painting is on display in the United States Capitol.

History and description
Moran participated in an 1871 survey, led by Ferdinand Vandeveer Hayden, which explored the area that would become Yellowstone National Park. Moran spent several days sketching the Grand Canyon of the Yellowstone from different vantage points. Hayden's extensive report on the expedition, which included sketches and paintings by Moran, as well as photographs by William Henry Jackson, was instrumental in persuading Congress to preserve the area as a national park. On March 1, 1872, Yellowstone became the world's first national park, when President Ulysses S. Grant signed the Yellowstone National Park Protection Act into law.

The Grand Canyon of the Yellowstone provides an idealized view of the topography of the Grand Canyon of the Yellowstone in the late 19th century. The viewer's attention is attracted to the Yellowstone River running through the V of the canyon, in spite of the river being dwarfed by the rocky, arid landscape dominated by ocher and brown. Green firs and pines punctuate the desolate panorama. Though the painting suggests a primordial environment untouched by civilization, several Native Americans, witnesses to the majesty of nature, can be seen in the left foreground.

The large painting was purchased by Congress in 1872, for $10,000. It is part of the collection of the Smithsonian American Art Museum, but is displayed in the National Statuary Hall in the United States Capitol. 

Moran found critical and commercial success with his sketches and paintings of Yellowstone. He would subsequently travel the American West and create many more works of art, including a second painting titled The Grand Canyon of the Yellowstone (1893–1901), which displays a more mature treatment of the same landscape.

Reception
The Grand Canyon of the Yellowstone was met with critical acclaim. The poet and editor Richard Watson Gilder called it the "most remarkable work of art which has been exhibited in this country for a long time." The painting also captured the public's imagination, and influenced the decision to preserve Yellowstone National Park for future generations.

See also
Grand Canyon of the Yellowstone

References

1870s paintings
Landscape paintings
Paintings by Thomas Moran
Paintings in the collection of the Smithsonian American Art Museum
Water in art
Yellowstone National Park